Khoresh bademjan ( or , or in IPA: /xɒrɛʃ ˈbɔˌdəmˈd͡ʒuːn/) is a Persian stew of eggplant and tomatoes. The word khoresh means "stew," and bādemjān means "eggplant."

About 
Typically this dish is made of fried and skinned eggplants, optional lamb or beef, tomatoes, an acidic component such as sour grape juice or sun dried limes and mild aromatic spices such as turmeric, cinnamon and saffron. This dish is typically served over Persian rice. You can also cook this stew with chicken as you wish.

Variations 
Two different versions of this stew are prevalent in Iranian cuisine: 
 Ghoore bademjan – sour grape and eggplant stew 
 Ghoore means "unripe", referring to the grapes
 Usually made with fresh sour grapes or verjuice and has a thinner and aromatic broth.
 Gheymeh bademjan – yellow split peas and eggplant stew 
 Gheymeh (Gheimeh) means "chopped meat"
 Fried eggplants are used instead of fried potatoes, similar to the khoresh gheimeh (yellow split peas and fried potato stew).

References

External links
 Brief history and variations
 How to cook eggplant stew with split peas
 How to cook eggplant stew with sour grapes

Iranian cuisine
Iranian stews